First Presbyterian Society of Cape Vincent, also known as the United Church of Cape Vincent, is a historic Presbyterian church located at Cape Vincent, Jefferson County, New York.  It consists of a main block (1832), wood-framed narthex and tower (1884), and meeting hall (1959).  The main block is a -story, Federal style limestone structure.  The -story narthex has Gothic Revival style design elements.  The main block was extensively rehabilitated in 1882, 1892, and 1914.

It was added to the National Register of Historic Places in 2013.

References

Presbyterian churches in New York (state)
Churches on the National Register of Historic Places in New York (state)
Federal architecture in New York (state)
Gothic Revival church buildings in New York (state)
Churches completed in 1832
Churches in Jefferson County, New York
National Register of Historic Places in Jefferson County, New York